The 2019 Mountain West Conference men's basketball tournament was the postseason men's basketball tournament for the Mountain West Conference. It was held from March 13–16, 2019 at the Thomas & Mack Center on the campus of University of Nevada, Las Vegas, in Las Vegas, Nevada. Utah State defeated San Diego State 64–57 in the championship to earn the Mountain West's automatic bid to the NCAA tournament.

Seeds
All 11 MW schools were eligible to participate in the tournament. Teams were seeded by conference record. Ties were broken by record between the tied teams, followed by record against the regular-season champion, if necessary. As a result, the top five teams (Utah State, Nevada, Fresno State, San Diego State and UNLV) received byes into the tournament quarterfinals. The remaining teams will play in the first round. Tie-breaking procedures will remain unchanged from the 2018 tournament:
 Head-to-head record between the tied teams
 Record against the highest-seeded team not involved in the tie, going down through the seedings as necessary
 Higher RPI:

Schedule

Bracket

* denotes overtime period

See also
2019 Mountain West Conference women's basketball tournament

References

Official website - Mountain West Conference men's basketball tournament

Mountain West Conference men's basketball tournament
Tournament
Mountain West Conference men's basketball tournament
Mountain West Conference men's basketball tournament
College sports tournaments in Nevada